Mary Ann Furnace Historic District, also known as Trexler's Furnace, is a historic "iron plantation" and national historic district located in Longswamp Township, Berks County, Pennsylvania.  The district encompasses five contributing buildings, one contributing site, and one contributing structure.  They are the iron furnace stack (1789), stone and frame bank barn (c. 1830-1860), manager's house and office (c. 1830-1860), blacksmith shop (1854), charcoal house (c. 1850), stone dam, and small stone house (c. 1830-1850).  The furnace remained in operation until 1869.  It is commemorated by a historical marker erected in 1924. Today it is owned by the Rohrbach family. They continue to keep the property as historical as possible.

It was listed on the National Register of Historic Places in 1991.

References

Industrial buildings and structures on the National Register of Historic Places in Pennsylvania
Historic districts on the National Register of Historic Places in Pennsylvania
Historic districts in Berks County, Pennsylvania
1789 establishments in Pennsylvania
National Register of Historic Places in Berks County, Pennsylvania
Blacksmith shops